Lin Mo (Chinese:林墨; born Huang Qi-lin Chinese:黄其淋 on January 6, 2002) is a Chinese singer, songwriter, dancer, and actor. He is best known for being a member of the boy group Into1 after placing sixth on the finale of Produce Camp 2021. He is also a member of the boy group Yi’an Music Club.

Early life and Career

2014-present: Debut with Yi'an Music Club, Solo debut and Debut with Into1
From 2013, Lin Mo was a trainee under TF Entertainment. He participated in various variety shows and made his acting debut under the company. After his contract expired in November 2016, he left TF Entertainmen and joined Original Plan Entertainment

In 2017, Lin Mo became a first generation student of 'Yi'an Music Club', the group made their official debut on March 30, 2017, with their single "Chitty Bang Bang Bang". On September 29, 2017, Lin Mo starred in the Yi'an Music Club original Theater Show "The Emergency 24 Hours of Yi'an Musical".

On May 30, 2019, he released the collaboration single "Runaway alongside Sun Yi-hang. On July 31, 2019, he made his official solo debut with the single "Sea, Ground, Sky", in which he participated in the lyric writing.  On August 18, 2019, he released the OST single "Twin Stars" alongside Sun Yi-hang for the Chinese web drama "Endless Eighteen". on December 3, the song "Alive" with Yu Muyang and Mo Wenxuan was released. On December 18, he released the solo single "Talking to oneself"

On July 15, 2020, he released the solo single "Shallow words with Deep Love".

On January 7, 2021 he starred in the Chinese television drama "Youth Melody, playing as the main role. On February 1, 2021 he released the solo single "Make Me Wanna". On February 18, 2021 he participated in the survival reality competition show Produce Camp 2021. On the final episode on April 24, 2021, he placed sixth and became a member of the multi-national boy group Into1

Ambassadorships and Endorsements
Alongside his activities with Into1, Lin Mo has various endorsements with brands becoming their brand ambassador and spokesperson; brand such as: Tide, Pocky, Coach and more. As well as this, he has appeared on the cover on magazines such as Madame Figaro

Discography

Singles

Collaborative Singles

Soundtrack Appearances

Other Songs

Songwriting Credits

Filmography

Web Dramas

Web Show

Television Show

Theater

Notes

References

External links
 
 Lin Mo on QQ Music 

2002 births
Living people
Into1 members
Reality show winners
21st-century Chinese male singers
Chinese idols
Mandopop singers
Chinese male television actors
Chinese male dancers
Chinese male singers
Singers from Chongqing
Male actors from Chongqing